Rustam Khan may refer to:

 Rostom of Kartli, a Georgian vali/king
 Rustam Khan Zand, a Zand dynasty prince. 
 Rostam Khan (sepahsalar under Safi), a Safavid general of Georgian origin 
 Rostam Khan (sepahsalar under Suleiman I), Safavid general of Georgian origin 
 Prince Rostom of Kartli, 18th-century Georgian royal who served in the Safavid ranks
 Rostam Khan Judaki, a village in Iran
 Rostam Khan, Ilam, a village in Iran